No. 19 Squadron (19 SQN), formerly 324 Combat Support Squadron (324CSS), is a Royal Australian Air Force ground support squadron based at Royal Malaysian Air Force Base Butterworth in Penang. 324CSS was formed on 30 January 1999 and took on its new name of 19 SQN on 1 January 2014. 19SQN is responsible for providing support to Australian Defence Force exercises and deployments in South-East Asia. 19SQN's day-to-day responsibilities focus on supporting the ADF units and personnel at RMAF Base Butterworth, including a detachment of Boeing P-8 Poseidon aircraft from No. 92 Wing RAAF and the Australian Army's Rifle Company Butterworth.

Reference 
324 Combat Support Squadron

324
Military units and formations established in 1999
Military units and formations disestablished in 2014
1999 establishments in Australia